Gebhard I may refer to:

 Gebhard I (Bishop of Regensburg) (died 1023)
 Gebhard I von Mansfeld-Vorderort (ca. 1525/30–1562)